Barack Obama Academy is a small alternative middle school in Oakland, California. It is part of the Oakland Unified School District. It became notable as the first middle school in the United States to be officially named or renamed after US President Barack Obama in March 2009. The middle school, which opened in 2007, was formerly known as the Alternative Learning Community.  The name change was prompted by the school's students.

As of 2011 it had 24 students, most of whom were low income African Americans.

References

Public middle schools in California
Oakland Unified School District
Schools in Alameda County, California